WINT or Wint may refer to:

Broadcast stations 
WANE-TV, a television station (channel 15) licensed to Fort Wayne, Indiana, United States, which identified as WINT from 1954 to 1957
WCPT-TV, a television station (channel 20) licensed to Crossville, Tennessee, United States, which identified as WINT-TV from 1982 to 1983
WINT (AM), a radio station (1330 AM) licensed to Willoughby, Ohio, United States
WLZR, a radio station (1560 AM) licensed to in Melbourne, Florida, United States, which identified as WINT from 2003 to 2012

Locations 
Fort Wint, on Grande Island, in the Philippines
DeWint House, in Rockland County, New York, United States

People

Surnamed "Wint" 
Arthur Wint (1920–1992), first Jamaican Olympic gold medallist
Maurice Dean Wint (born 1962), British-American actor
Peter De Wint (1784–1849), British landscape painter
Arthur De Wint Foote (1849–1933), U.S. civil engineer

Nicknamed "Wint" 
Winton A. Winter Sr. (1930–2013), U.S. politician
@dril, also known as wint, a popular Twitter user known for his idiosyncratic humor

Fictional characters 
Mr. Wint, a James Bond villain

See also 
WIN-T (disambiguation)
Theodore Wint Grave, a 1908 grave in Arlington National Cemetery known for its artwork